Long Time or Longtime may refer to:
 "Foreplay/Long Time", a 1976 song by Boston
 "Long Time" (Cake song), 2011
 "Longtime" (Ash Grunwald song), 2012
 "Long Time" (Blondie song), 2017
 "Long Time", a 2018 song by Playboi Carti from the album Die Lit
 "Longtime" (Wizkid song), 2020